Yannai is both a given name and a surname. Notable people with the name include:

 Michal Yannai (born 1972), Israeli actress
 Alexander Jannaeus
 Yanai (Payetan)
 Rabbi Yannai (Rabbi Jannai), 3rd century Jewish sage